Bizrate Insights Inc., doing business as Bizrate Insights, is a market research company, providing consumer ratings information to over 6,000 retailers and publishers across the United States, United Kingdom, France, Germany, and Canada.  Bizrate Insights is a Dotdash Meredith company based in Los Angeles, CA.

Bizrate Insights provides services to both businesses and consumers in two different ways:  consumers have access to ratings and reviews from verified buyers that help to inform their purchase decisions.  This feedback can be found on the Bizrate website and is syndicated across the web to major search engines such as Google and Bing.  Bizrate Insights provides businesses with customer satisfaction insights about consumers, advanced analytics, and competitive benchmarks across all types of online retail industries.

Bizrate Insights also provides industry research to analysts at Forrester Research, eMarketer, Digital Commerce 360 and Internet Retailer among others for publication and studies.

History 
Binary Compass Enterprises, the original name for what would later become Bizrate, was founded in June 1996, by classmates, at the University of California Los Angeles and Wharton School of Business, Farhad Mohit and Henri Asseily.  The pair used a school project they authored while attending the Wharton School of the University of Pennsylvania as the basis for their original model of a research company.

The first retailer reviews were collected in 1997 after launching and rebranding the website as Bizrate.com.  Services were later expanded to include comparison shopping.

In August 1999, during the earlier days of online shopping, Bizrate partnered with Consumer Reports to provide retailer ratings and research in both the print and online editions of the Consumer Reports Magazine.  During this year, Bizrate also launched its "Don't get e-screwed campaign", bringing the site to the forefront as the place to find reliable feedback from other customers.

In 2004, Bizrate rebranded to Shopzilla, reflecting consumers’ increased focus on price comparison, and launched Shopzilla.com.  During this time, the ratings and reviews side of the business was also rebranded to Bizrate Insights in order to maintain a clear definition of services.  Bizrate Insights continued to provide retailer ratings and reviews to both Bizrate.com and Shopzilla.com.  In 2010, Bizrate Insights formed a partnership with Google to begin distributing retailer ratings and reviews from Bizrate Insights to Google Product Search and Google AdWords ads. Since then, this has been expanded to include syndication to a number of partners across the internet.
Between 2005 and 2016, before becoming part of Time Inc., Bizrate Insights, under Shopzilla, was included in a number of acquisitions and expansions including:
 In June 2005, E.W. Scripps acquires Shopzilla, which included all operating websites and Bizrate Insights. Source: https://scripps.com/press-releases/488-scripps-to-acquire-shopzilla
 In June 2011, Symphony Technology Group acquires Shopzilla, including all operating websites and Bizrate Insights.
 September 2014, Shopzilla.com rebrands to Connexity, Inc.; Bizrate Insights continues to operate under the Connexity umbrella.
 In June 2015, Connexity acquires PriceGrabber.  Customer feedback collected under PriceGrabber is now collected by Bizrate Insights.
 In September 2016, The Bizrate Insights division of Connexity is acquired by Synapse Group Inc., a Division of Time Inc.
 In January 2018, Time inc. and its subsidiaries, including Bizrate Insights, were purchased by Meredith Corporation
 In October 2021, Meredith announced an agreement whereby the company's magazine and other non-broadcast assets, including Synapse Group Inc. and Bizrate Insights, would be acquired by IAC's Dotdash, forming a new entity called Dotdash Meredith.

Products and services 
Bizrate Survey: The Bizrate Insights Buyer Survey consists of two parts, which allow customers to provide feedback throughout the purchase and receipt experience. Part one of the Buyer Survey is conducted on the order confirmation page and covers point-of-sale topics such as overall satisfaction, product selection, ease of finding products, and checkout. Part 2 of the Buyer Survey is emailed to consumers who responded to the first half of the survey.  This is a post-order fulfillment survey that measures repurchase intent, whether the product met expectations, customer support satisfaction, and on-time delivery.  Each half of this survey allows customers to provide open-ended comments. Results from this feedback are syndicated to external seller ratings partners.

Site Abandonment Survey: The Bizrate Insights Site Abandonment survey is available to all retailers who utilize the Buyer survey.  This survey asks customers to provide feedback when leaving the site without completing a purchase. Topics include: visit intent, point of abandonment, reasons for abandonment, future purchase intent, and open-ended comments.  This data is intended for use by the retailer only, to improve the site experience, and is not syndicated.

Other Surveys: Bizrate Insights can also provide access to any number of other survey types and verticals based on partner needs including in-store/receipt, customer support, phone orders, and more.

Reporting: The retailer data that Bizrate Insights collects is available for review via several standardized reporting mechanisms:

 VitalSigns: Proprietary online portal that allows partners to access their data and comments in real-time.
 VitalMail: Daily snapshot of key metrics and customer comments.
 Benchmarking: Allows for comparison of category retailers versus individual retailers’ performance.  Data can also be found on Bizrate.com merchant rating pages.
 Syndication: Seller ratings review syndication to a number of partners including Google and Bing.

References

External links 
 Bizrate Insights Website
 Bizrate Survey

Market research companies of the United States
2016 mergers and acquisitions
Companies established in 1996
Companies based in Los Angeles